This is a list of operatic sopranos and mezzo-sopranos who were born in Denmark or whose work is closely associated with that country.

A
Signe Asmussen (born 1970), mezzo-soprano who has performed in opera, operetta, classical concerts and jazz

B

Oda Balsborg (1934–2014), soprano, recordings of Wagnerian performances
Lisbeth Balslev (born 1945), soprano specializing in Wagnerian opera
Henriette Bonde-Hansen (born 1963), soprano opera singer and concert performer, Reumert prize in 2014
Charlotte Bournonville (1832–1911), actress and mezzo-soprano singer who sang in Stockholm before joining the Royal Danish Theatre
Johanne Brun (1874–1954), opera singer who also performed in Germany

D
Inger Dam-Jensen (born 1964), soprano taking leading roles at the Royal Danish Theatre
Elisabeth Dons (1864–1942), Paris-trained soprano and mezzo-soprano becoming a prima donna in the 1890s

E
Birgit Engell (1882–1973), German-born Danish operatic soprano who later specialized in concerts

F
Emilie da Fonseca (1803–1884), Norwegian-Danish actress and opera singer
Ida Henriette da Fonseca (1802–1858), mezzo-soprano singer and composer who performed in operas and concerts mainly in Sweden and Germany
Povla Frijsh (1881–1960), classical soprano and voice teacher

G
Leocadie Gerlach (1826–1919), Danish-Swedish mezzo-soprano considered the most successful singer of her day at the Royal Danish Theatre
Edith Guillaume (1943–2013), mezzo-soprano with the Danish National Opera and the Royal Danish Opera
Ruth Guldbæk (1919–2006), soprano at the Royal Danish Theatre, also at Covent Garden

H
Kirsten Hermansen (1930–2015), soprano at the Royal Danish Teacher, later music teacher

J
Louise Janssen (1863–1938), Danish-born soprano who sang Wagnerian roles in Lyon, France
Eva Johansson (born 1958), soprano who has performed in opera worldwide, especially in Germany and the United States

K
Sophie Keller (1850–1929), soprano with the Royal Danish Theatre who later founded a conservatory for women
Tina Kiberg (born 1958), soprano who has performed leading roles in the operas of Richard Strauss and Richard Wagner
Lone Koppel (born 1938), leading soprano performer at the Royal Danish Theatre
Tenna Kraft (1885–1954), outstanding soprano at the Royal Danish Theatre in the early 20th century
Johanne Krarup-Hansen (1870–1958), mezzo-soprano at the Royal Danish Theatre, remembered as the first Danish Brünnhilde in Die Walküre

L
Lilly Lamprecht (1887–1976), award-winning soprano who sang at the Royal Danish Theatre from 1911

Dorothy Larsen (1911–1990), American-born Danish operatic soprano who performed at the Royal Danish Theatre
Margrethe Lendrop (1873–1920), soprano at the Royal Danish Theatre where she took the role of Carmen 131 times
Anna Henriette Levinsohn (1839–1899), soprano and mezzo.soprano at the Royal Danish Theatre from 1860
Augusta Lütken (1855–1910), popular yet untrained soprano, nine years at the Royal Danish Theatre

M
Ida Møller (1872–1947), soprano at the Royal Danish Theatre remembered for her roles in Mozart's operas
Caroline Müller (1755–1826), highly successful mezzo-soprano first in Copenhagen and later in Stockholm

N
Anna Nielsen (1803–1856), actress and mezzo-soprano singer performing with success at the Royal Danish Theatre in both plays and operas
Inga Nielsen (1946–2008), soprano who sang in opera houses throughout Europe and the United States
Ingeborg Nørregaard Hansen (1874–1941), soprano at the Royal Danish Theatre where she became a leading Wagnerian performer

O
Edith Oldrup (1912–1999), soprano at the Royal Danish Opera remembered for her roles in the operas of Mozart and Puccini

Q
Hedevig Quiding (1867–1936), soprano in German opera houses, voice instructor and music critic

S
Louise Sahlgreen (1818–1891), soprano, first in the choir at the Royal Danish Theatre, later performing operatic roles
Else Schøtt (1895–1989), soprano at the Royal Danish Theatre from 1919 to 1951, later a voice teacher
Catharine Simonsen (1816–1849), soprano at the Royal Danish Theatre, noted for her roles in Italian operas
Bonna Søndberg (born 1933), sang both mezzo-soprano and soprano roles at the Royal Danish Theatre until her retirement in 1987
Ingeborg Steffensen (1888–1964), mezzo-soprano at the Royal Danish Theatre remembered for her performances of Carmen, Dalila and Azuncena

U
Emilie Ulrich (1872–1952), soprano in leading roles at the Royal Danish Theatre until 1917

W
Lilian Weber Hansen (1911–1987), mezzo-soprano at the Royal Danish Theatre for 25 years from 1940 remembered for her dramatic roles
Ebba Wilton (1896–1949), foremost coloratura singer of her generation at the Royal Danish Theatre

Z
Josephine Zinck (1829–1919), mezzo-soprano in concerts at the Musikforeningen and in operas at the Royal Danish Theatre
Marie Zinck (1789–1823), popular actress and singer who performed in plays, operas and operettas at the Royal Danish Theatre

References

operatic sopranos
Lists of women by occupation and nationality